Washington Brandão dos Santos (born 18 August 1990) is a Brazilian footballer who plays as a forward for Hoàng Anh Gia Lai.

Career

HB Køge
On 30 June 2014, Brandão signed a two-year contract with Danish 1st Division club HB Køge after a successful trial. He made his debut on 25 July, scoring after only six minutes in a 1–1 draw against Skive IK. During his stint with the club, he made 51 appearances in which he scored 20 goals.

Vendsyssel FF
Brandão moved to Vendsyssel FF on 22 January 2016, signing a three-year deal. He made his debut on 17 March, coming on as a substitute for Mads Greve in the 73rd minute of a 2–0 league loss to Lyngby Boldklub. On 28 April, Brandão scored his first goal for the club, which also proved to be the winner, in a 1–0 win over Silkeborg IF.

At the end of the 2017–18 season, Brandão helped the team win promotion to the Danish Superliga for the first time.

Persela Lamongan
In February 2019, Brandão joined Persela Lamongan in Indonesia. He played two games for the club in the Piala Indonesia and four games in the Indonesia President's Cup where he also scored three goals. However, the club was not satisfied with the player. The club decided not to use him for the 2019 Liga 1 season. The club announced in April 2019, that his quality was good but they needed a pure striker and that the coaching staff had recommended him not to continue.

Petaling Jaya City
Following his departure from Indonesia, Brandão joined Malaysian club Petaling Jaya City.

Hoàng Anh Gia Lai
In 2021, Brandão moved to V.League 1 club Hoàng Anh Gia Lai. He had a strong start to the campaign, contributing with two goals in his first eight appearances, and "integrated well" to a team consisting of mostly homegrown Vietnamese players.

References

1990 births
Living people
Brazilian footballers
Brazilian expatriate footballers
Campeonato Brasileiro Série D players
Danish Superliga players
Danish 1st Division players
Liga 1 (Indonesia) players
Malaysia Super League players
Araguaína Futebol e Regatas players
Clube Esportivo Bento Gonçalves players
HB Køge players
Vendsyssel FF players
Esporte Clube Passo Fundo players
Persela Lamongan players
Petaling Jaya City FC players
Association football forwards
Expatriate men's footballers in Denmark
Expatriate footballers in Indonesia
Expatriate footballers in Malaysia
Brazilian expatriate sportspeople in Denmark
Brazilian expatriate sportspeople in Indonesia
Brazilian expatriate sportspeople in Malaysia
Hoang Anh Gia Lai FC players
V.League 1 players
Expatriate footballers in Vietnam
Brazilian expatriate sportspeople in Vietnam